The Dutch Eredivisie in the 1981–82 season was contested by 18 teams. Ajax won the championship. From this season onwards, three clubs relegated instead of two.

League standings

Results

See also
 1981–82 Eerste Divisie
 1981–82 KNVB Cup

References

 Eredivisie official website - info on all seasons 
 RSSSF

Eredivisie seasons
Netherlands
1